Enny Manuel Romero Hernandez (born January 24, 1991) is a Dominican professional baseball pitcher for the SSG Landers of the Korea Baseball Organization (KBO). He previously played in Major League Baseball (MLB) for the Tampa Bay Rays, Washington Nationals, Pittsburgh Pirates and Kansas City Royals and in Nippon Professional Baseball (NPB) for the Chunichi Dragons.

Professional career

Tampa Bay Rays
Romero represented the Rays at the 2012 All-Star Futures Game. He was added to the Rays' 40-man roster on November 20, 2012. Romero was called up to start against the Baltimore Orioles on September 22, 2013. After spending the entirety of the 2014 season in the minor leagues, Romero returned to major league action in the 2015 season as a reliever, pitching 30 innings for the Rays on the year. Starting the 2016 season, Romero retired 17 consecutive batters across relief appearances to set a franchise record for the Rays. Romero notched his first career save on August 25, 2016, striking out slugger David Ortiz to seal a Rays victory over the division rival Boston Red Sox. In total, Romero pitched to a 5.27 ERA over 80⅓ innings with the Rays across three seasons, exhibiting a high walk rate of about five batters per nine innings.

Washington Nationals

The Rays traded Romero to the Washington Nationals for minor league pitcher Jeffrey Rosa on February 7, 2017.

Romero pitched for the Dominican Republic national baseball team in the 2017 World Baseball Classic, earning the win in a March 12 game against Colombia with a scoreless inning of relief. He joined the Nationals at spring training after the initial round of the WBC.

With the Nationals, Romero quickly became a key cog in manager Dusty Baker's bullpen as it struggled to find its footing over the first half of the season, going through three closers before Baker decided to handle the ninth inning by committee. While Romero continued to walk batters at an above-average rate, as he had with Tampa Bay, his strikeout rate climbed and his earned run average declined relative to what it had been with the Rays. He was frequently deployed to handle the eighth and even the ninth inning.

Romero began the 2018 season on the Nationals′ roster, but in two appearances posted a 13.50 ERA in two innings of work. The Nationals designated him for assignment on April 7, 2018.

Pittsburgh Pirates
On April 14, 2018, the Pittsburgh Pirates claimed Romero off waivers. He appeared in two games for the Pirates, hitting a double in his first at-bat, but in the four innings he pitched he gave up five runs, three of them unearned, on seven hits, giving him an ERA with Pittsburgh of 7.50. In order to make room on their roster for the major-league debut of pitching prospect Nick Kingham, the Pirates initially decided to designate Romero for assignment on April 29, but within hours changed their minds after Romero and his agent informed them that Romero had injured his shoulder while pitching on April 25. The Pirates instead opted to place him on the 10-day disabled list. He was designated for assignment on July 2.

Kansas City Royals
The Kansas City Royals claimed Romero off waivers on July 5, 2018. On July 21, 2018, he was designated for assignment. On July 26, 2018, Romero elected to become a free agent.

Chunichi Dragons
On December 3, 2018, it was announced that Romero had signed with the Chunichi Dragons in the NPB's Central League.

On April 4, 2019, Romero made his NPB debut. After the season, he re-signed with Dragons.

On December 2, 2020, he became a free agent.

Los Angeles Dodgers
On January 14, 2021, Romero signed a minor league contract with the Los Angeles Dodgers organization that included an invitation to major league Spring Training. He was released on April 4, 2021.

Chiba Lotte Marines
On August 10, 2021, Romero signed with the Chiba Lotte Marines of Nippon Professional Baseball. He became a free agent following the 2022 season.

SSG Landers
On December 12, 2022, Romero signed with the SSG Landers of the Korea Baseball Organization.

Pitching style
Romero's main weapon is a blazing fastball, which he threw in the high 90s while in the Tampa Bay Rays organization but which began routinely hitting the century mark in 2017, beginning at the World Baseball Classic. In a July 2017 game with the Washington Nationals, Romero hit  with his fastball in a strikeout of Atlanta Braves star Freddie Freeman.

Perhaps the most notable drawback in Romero's game throughout his professional career has been a lack of command, with a high walk rate coloring his time in Tampa Bay. During 2017 spring training with the Nationals, a MASN Sports beat reporter noted that he appeared to have made adjustments allowing him to better locate his pitches, and Romero exhibited improved command into the 2017 season.

References

External links

 Career statistics - NPB.jp
 91 エンニー・ロメロ 選手名鑑2021 - Chiba Lotte Marines Official site 

1991 births
Living people
Altoona Curve players
Bowling Green Hot Rods players
Bradenton Marauders players
Charlotte Stone Crabs players
Chunichi Dragons players
Chiba Lotte Marines players
Dominican Republic expatriate baseball players in Japan
Dominican Republic expatriate baseball players in the United States
Dominican Summer League Rays players
Durham Bulls players
Gulf Coast Rays players
Hudson Valley Renegades players
Indianapolis Indians players
Kansas City Royals players
Leones del Escogido players
Major League Baseball pitchers
Major League Baseball players from the Dominican Republic
Montgomery Biscuits players
Nippon Professional Baseball pitchers
Pittsburgh Pirates players
Princeton Rays players
Sportspeople from Santo Domingo
Tampa Bay Rays players
Washington Nationals players
World Baseball Classic players of the Dominican Republic
2017 World Baseball Classic players
2019 WBSC Premier12 players